Kanowna is the name of several things

Kanowna, Western Australia, a ghost town in Western Australia
TSS Kanowna, an Australian steamer built during 1902 which sank in 1929
Kanowna Belle Gold Mine, a gold mine in Western Australia.